Lake Chaupicocha (possibly from Quechua chawpi central, middle, qucha lake) is a lake in Peru located in the Puno Region, Carabaya Province, Macusani District. It lies in the Carabaya mountain range, south of Allincapac and southwest of Chichicapac.

References 

Lakes of Peru
Lakes of Puno Region